Elachista magidina is a moth of the family Elachistidae that is found in the coastal forests of New South Wales and the Lamington National Park in  southern Queensland.

The forewings are white while the hindwings are grey.

The larvae feed on Lepidosperma laterale and Lepidosperma elatius. They mine the leaves of their host plant. Young larvae mine upwards, creating a straight and narrow initial stage of the mine. Later, the mine slowly widens and often turns downwards. The mine reaches a length of about 200 mm. Pupation takes place outside of the mine on a leaf of the host plant.

References

magidina
Moths described in 2011
Endemic fauna of Australia
Moths of Australia
Taxa named by Lauri Kaila